The women's 1500 metres race of the 2014–15 ISU Speed Skating World Cup 7, arranged in the Gunda Niemann-Stirnemann-Halle in Erfurt, Germany, will be held on 21 March 2015.

Result
The race took place on Saturday, 21 March, scheduled in the afternoon session, at 14:56.

References

Women 1500
7